Navarone Foor (born 4 February 1992) is a Dutch professional footballer who plays as a winger for Eredivisie club Cambuur.

Club career

NEC Nijmegen
Born in Opheusden, Foor left local side Opheusden in 2009 to join NEC. On 6 August 2011, Foor made his NEC debut in a 2–2 draw with Heerenveen, in which he replaced Lasse Schöne in the 79th minute. On 10 September 2011, Foor was given his first NEC start against local rivals De Graafschap. The game resulted in a 1–0 victory for De Graafschap and Foor played until the 71st minute before being replaced by Manchester City loanee Abdisalam Ibrahim. On 22 April 2012, Foor scored his first NEC goal in a 2–1 defeat to PSV. On 10 May 2012, Foor continued his impressive form with a goal against rivals Vitesse, which eventually finished a 3–2 victory to NEC.

Foor quickly became a fan favourite at NEC with his consistent performances spread over five years at the club. Foor played a big part in NEC's Eerste Divisie triumph, in which he netted seven times from 37 appearances. Foor went on to make 154 league appearances for NEC, scoring on 15 occasions.

Vitesse
On 13 May 2016, Foor joined fierce rivals Vitesse on a four-year deal on a free transfer after his contract expired at NEC. On 11 September 2016, Foor made his Vitesse debut in a 1–0 away defeat to Ajax, featuring for 64 minutes before being replaced by Nathan. On 23 October 2016, Foor scored his first goal for Vitesse in a 1–1 draw against former club NEC, opening the scoring in the 38th minute.

He played as Vitesse won the final of the KNVB Beker 2–0 against AZ Alkmaar on 30 April 2017 to help the club, three-time runners up, to the title for the first time in its 125-year history.

Ittihad Kalba
On 3 February 2020, Ittihad Kalba signed Foor from Vitesse.

Riga FC
On 28 August 2022, Foor signed for Latvian Higher League club Riga FC having spent two seasons in Cyprus with Pafos FC.

Cambuur
On 28 January 2023, Foor signed for Cambuur on a contract until the end of the season.

International career
Foor has represented Netherlands at under-19, under-20 and under-21 level. Foor is also eligible to represent Indonesia at international level through his family's Moluccan heritage.

Career statistics

References

External links
 
 

1992 births
Living people
Dutch people of Indonesian descent
People from Neder-Betuwe
Association football wingers
Dutch footballers
Dutch expatriate footballers
Netherlands youth international footballers
Netherlands under-21 international footballers
NEC Nijmegen players
SBV Vitesse players
Al-Ittihad Kalba SC players
Pafos FC players
Riga FC players
SC Cambuur players
Eredivisie players
Eerste Divisie players
UAE Pro League players
Cypriot First Division players
Dutch expatriate sportspeople in the United Arab Emirates
Expatriate footballers in the United Arab Emirates
Dutch expatriate sportspeople in Cyprus
Expatriate footballers in Cyprus
Dutch expatriate sportspeople in Latvia
Expatriate footballers in Latvia
Footballers from Gelderland